Lerodea arabus, known generally as the violet-clouded skipper or olive-clouded skipper, is a species of grass skipper in the butterfly family Hesperiidae. It is found in Central America and North America.

The MONA or Hodges number for Lerodea arabus is 4112.

References

Further reading

 

Hesperiinae
Articles created by Qbugbot